The Communauté de communes du Pays de Montereau (before 2017: Communauté de communes des Deux Fleuves) is a federation of municipalities (communauté de communes) in the Seine-et-Marne département and in the Île-de-France région of France. On 1 January 2017 it was expanded with 7 communes from the former Communauté de communes du Bocage Gâtinais, and its name was changed from Communauté de communes des Deux Fleuves to Communauté de communes du Pays de Montereau. Established on 23 April 1974, its seat is Montereau-Fault-Yonne. Its area is 272.9 km2, and its population was 43,461 in 2018, of which 20,712 in Montereau-Fault-Yonne.

Composition
The communauté de communes consists of the following 21 communes:

Barbey
Blennes
La Brosse-Montceaux
Cannes-Écluse
Chevry-en-Sereine
Courcelles-en-Bassée
Diant
Esmans
Forges
La Grande-Paroisse
Laval-en-Brie
Marolles-sur-Seine
Misy-sur-Yonne
Montereau-Fault-Yonne
Montmachoux
Noisy-Rudignon
Saint-Germain-Laval
Salins
Thoury-Férottes
Varennes-sur-Seine
Voulx

See also
Communes of the Seine-et-Marne department

References

Montereau
Montereau